Alexander Zverev defeated Novak Djokovic in the final, 6–4, 6–3 to win the men's singles tennis title at the 2017 Italian Open. It was his first Masters 1000 title, and he became the first player born in the 1990s to win a Masters title.

Andy Murray was the defending champion, but lost in the second round to Fabio Fognini.

Seeds
The top eight seeds receive a bye into the second round.

Draw

Finals

Top half

Section 1

Section 2

Bottom half

Section 3

Section 4

Qualifying

Seeds

Qualifiers

Lucky losers

Qualifying draw

First qualifier

Second qualifier

Third qualifier

Fourth qualifier

Fifth qualifier

Sixth qualifier

Seventh qualifier

References

Main Draw
Qualifying Draw

Men's Singles